Lithophane dilatocula is a species of cutworm or dart moth in the family Noctuidae. It is found in North America.

The MONA or Hodges number for Lithophane dilatocula is 9923.

References

Further reading

 
 
 

dilatocula
Articles created by Qbugbot
Moths described in 1900